Jérôme Neuville (born 15 August 1975 in Saint-Martin d'Hères, Isère) is a French racing cyclist.

He had a break in his track cycling career between 1999 and 2002, during which time he competed on the road as a professional cyclist with the Crédit Agricole team (1999 to 2001), and Cofidis (2002). Cofidis did not renew his contract so in 2003, Neuvile joined the amateur club AVC Aix-en-Provence.

He has competed at 4 Olympic Games in Atlanta, Sydney, Athens and Beijing.

Palmarès 

1996
1st Omnium, European Track Championships

1997
1st Omnium, European Track Championships
1st  Madison, French National Track Championships

1998
1st, Duo Normand (with Magnus Bäckstedt)

1999
1st  Madison, French National Track Championships

2001
1st  Madison, UCI Track Cycling World Championships
1st  Pursuit, French National Track Championships

2002
1st  Madison, UCI Track Cycling World Championships

2003
1st  Pursuit, French National Track Championships
1st  Madison, French National Track Championships

2005
1st  Madison, French National Track Championships

2006
1st  Scratch Race, UCI Track Cycling World Championships

References

External links

 

1975 births
Living people
French male cyclists
Olympic cyclists of France
Cyclists at the 1996 Summer Olympics
Cyclists at the 2000 Summer Olympics
Cyclists at the 2004 Summer Olympics
Cyclists at the 2008 Summer Olympics
People from Saint-Martin-d'Hères
UCI Track Cycling World Champions (men)
French track cyclists
Sportspeople from Isère
Cyclists from Auvergne-Rhône-Alpes